Miloš Jiránek (19 November 1875,  Lužec nad Vltavou — 2 November 1911, Prague) was a Czech Neo-Impressionist painter, art critic and writer.

Biography 
His father was a landowner and his mother came from a wealthy peasant family. While attending primary school in Prague, he lived with Jaroslav Vrchlický, where he had access to a huge library. He mastered foreign languages easily and read many books in the original. In 1894, he studied at the Faculty of Arts, Charles University. The following year, he transferred to the Academy of Fine Arts, where he began his studies with Maximilian Pirner and continued in the workshop of Vojtěch Hynais. In 1897, he joined the Mánes Union of Fine Arts.

In 1900, he travelled to Munich, Venice and Trieste, then accompanied his friend, to the Exposition Universelle, where he met Auguste Rodin. A few years later, he would play a major role in introducing the works of Rodin and Edvard Munch to Prague. He also spent three years in Slovakia, creating a cycle on the Tatra Mountains.

In 1905 he married the painter, Antonína Zedniková. For a time, they lived in Hradčany, where they painted some unconventional views of Prague Castle. Later that year he had what was described as a "nervous breakdown" and died late the following year of tubercular meningitis, at the age of 36. He was buried in Olšany Cemetery.

Selected paintings

Writings 
 Josef Mánes (illustrated biography),  Union of Fine Arts, 1909 Online @ Kramerius

References

Further reading 

 Tomáš Winter: Miloš Jiránek – Zápas o moderní malbu 1875-1911. Galerie výtvarného umění v Chebu/Arbor Vitae, 2012

External links

"The Polemics of Miloš Jiránek on view at National Gallery", interview with Jiří Kotalík @ Radio Prague
Miloš Jiránek @ abART

1875 births
1911 deaths
19th-century Czech painters
20th-century Czech painters
Post-impressionist painters
Czech art critics
20th-century deaths from tuberculosis
People from Mělník District
Czech male painters
Tuberculosis deaths in the Czech Republic
19th-century Czech male artists
20th-century Czech male artists